Rattray Head, historically Rattray Point, is a headland in Buchan, Aberdeenshire, on the north-east coast Scotland. To north lies Strathbeg Bay and Rattray Bay is to its south.

Rattray Head lighthouse 

The  Rattray Head lighthouse was built in 1895. It was built by the engineers and brothers David Alan Stevenson and Charles Alexander Stevenson. In February 1982 it became unmanned and self-working.

The lighthouse is accessible by way of a causeway that is usually underwater and only visible at low tide. It is wide enough for a vehicle to cross.

Remains of several shipwrecks can still be seen on the beach.

Access to the beach is by a narrow track with deep ruts, potholes and limited passing places which leads to a carpark and a short walk through the sand dunes (high ground clearance and good reversing skills required).

See also

 List of lighthouses in Scotland
 List of Northern Lighthouse Board lighthouses

References

External links 
 Northern Lighthouse Board 
 Rattray Head in the Gazetteer for Scotland
 Panorama of Rattray Head Lighthouse (QuickTime required)

Headlands of Scotland
Category B listed lighthouses
Landforms of Aberdeenshire